The Bern–Schwarzenburg railway line is a railway line in Switzerland. It was built by the Bern-Schwarzenburg-Bahn (Bern-Schwarzenburg Railway, BSB).
 
A train derailed in Ausserholligen station on 28 June 1916 and a carriage and overturned; one passenger died and 20 were injured.
 
The railway company merged on 1 January 1944 with the Gürbetalbahn (GTB) to form the Gürbetal-Bern-Schwarzenburg-Bahn (GBS), which continued the operation of the BSB line.
 
The GBS was then part of an operating group led by the Bern–Lötschberg–Simplon railway (Bern-Lötschberg-Simplon-Bahn, BLS). The four group companies merged in 1997 to form the BLS Lötschberg Railway, which in turn merged with the Regionalverkehr Mittelland (RM) in 2006 to form BLS AG, which now owns the former BSB line.

References

Footnotes

Sources
 

Railway lines in Switzerland
Railway lines opened in 1907
1907 establishments in Switzerland
BLS railway lines
Standard gauge railways in Switzerland
15 kV AC railway electrification